Thomas Byrne (born 1 June 1977) is an Irish Fianna Fáil politician and solicitor who was appointed Minister of State at the Department of Tourism, Culture, Arts, Gaeltacht, Sport and Media in December 2022. He previously served as Minister of State for European Affairs from July 2020 to December 2022. He has served as a Teachta Dála (TD) for Meath East from 2007 to 2011, and subsequently since 2016, during which period he held the position of Dáil Éireann opposition front bench spokesperson for Education and Skills. From 2011 to 2016, he was elected as a senator for the Cultural and Educational Panel, and worked as Seanad Éireann opposition front bench spokesperson for both Public Expenditure and Reform and Health, respectively.

Early life
Born on 1 June 1977 in Our Lady of Lourdes Hospital, Drogheda, Byrne is the eldest of seven children. He is the son of Thomas "Tommy" Byrne Snr (1945–2019), former Drogheda borough councillor, auctioneer and player-manager of Drogheda United F.C. and Kathleen (née Hilliard) Byrne. Byrne's younger brother, James Byrne, is currently a Fianna Fáil county councillor in Drogheda, County Louth. Other notable family relations include former Fianna Fáil TDs for Meath, Colm Hilliard (1936–2002), and his father Michael Hilliard (1903–1982), who served as Minister for Posts and Telegraphs, Minister for Defence and as a Member of the European Parliament (MEP).

Byrne was educated in Scoil Aonghusa national school and then Saint Mary's Diocesan School in Drogheda. Following graduation from Saint Mary's, Byrne attended university at Trinity College Dublin (TCD), where he gained an undergraduate degree in Law (LL.B.). Following his graduation, Byrne enrolled in the Law Society of Ireland.

Byrne worked as a solicitor at Feran & Co. law firm in Drogheda until his selection as a Fianna Fáil 2007 Irish general election candidate for the newly established constituency of Meath East. Though it was his first campaign for public office, Byrne was elected to Dáil Éireann with 7,834 first preference votes, making him the youngest member of the Fianna Fáil parliamentary party at the time.

Early political career

30th Dáil Éireann (2007–2011)
In 2007, following his inaugural election to Dáil Éireann, then Taoiseach and Leader of Fianna Fáil Bertie Ahern appointed Byrne as the Government Convenor of the Oireachtas Joint Committee on Social Protection and as a member of the Joint Oireachtas Committees on Justice and Defence, European Affairs and Finance, respectively.

During this period, Byrne was selected as a Fianna Fáil parliamentary party delegate to the National Forum on Europe. Following the initial unsuccessful referendum to ratify the Lisbon Treaty, Byrne was appointed to an Oireachtas sub-committee tasked with reviewing the causes of the Lisbon Treaty's rejection by the Irish electorate in June 2008. The Treaty was subsequently adopted following a second plebiscite in October 2009.

While serving his first Dáil term, the issue of young couple mortgage arrears in Meath East was one of Byrne's primary focuses as he co-authored a bipartisan report which instituted revised code of conduct regulations for mortgage lenders operating in Ireland.

In June 2009, following selection to run alongside the existing Fianna Fáil MEP Liam Aylward, Byrne unsuccessfully contested the 2009 European Parliament election for the East constituency receiving a total of 33,383 votes.

In November 2009, Byrne was appointed Uachtaráin (or President) Ógra Fhianna Fáil by then Taoiseach and Leader of Fianna Fáil Brian Cowen at the Ógra Fianna Fáil National Youth Conference.

24th Seanad Éireann (2011–2016)
Byrne lost his seat in the 2011 general election. He was elected as a Fianna Fáil senator for the Cultural and Educational Panel, and was appointed by then Leader of the Opposition Micheál Martin as Seanad Éireann opposition front bench spokesperson on Public Expenditure & Reform, and subsequently Health.

In March 2013, Byrne unsuccessfully contested a by-election in Meath East, which was held following the death of former Fine Gael TD Shane McEntee. Although Byrne received 8,002 first preference votes, he lost out to Shane McEntee's daughter, Helen McEntee, who replaced her father as a Meath East TD representing Fine Gael.

In May 2014, following selection to run alongside the existing Fianna Fáil MEP Pat "the Cope" Gallagher, Byrne unsuccessfully contested the European Parliament election for the Midlands-North-West constituency receiving a total of 64,057 votes.

32nd Dáil Éireann (2016–2020)
Following the 2016 general election, Byrne was re-elected to Dáil Éireann, receiving a total of 10,818 first preference votes (26.1%). On returning to Dáil Éireann, Byrne was appointed opposition front bench spokesperson for Education and Skills by then Leader of the Opposition Micheál Martin.

As opposition spokesperson for Education and Skills, Byrne opposed so-called 'baptism barrier' which was instituted in oversubscribed Irish Catholic primary schools. The practice, in line with Catholic primary schools admissions policies at the time, involved the lawful discrimination of student registration on the basis of religion. Following a bipartisan initiative to remove the obstacle, led by Byrne and then Minister for Education and Skills Richard Bruton, The Education (Admission to Schools) Bill was enacted by the Oireachtas, which prohibits selective enrolment predicated on religious factors.

In November 2019, Byrne was appointed Director of Elections by Fianna Fáil leader Micheál Martin for the 2019 Dublin Fingal by-election, to fill the Dáil vacancy created by the election of former Independents 4 Change TD Clare Daly to the European Parliament. However, Fianna Fáil Senator Lorraine Clifford-Lee lost the election to Green Party candidate Joe O’Brien TD.

33rd Dáil Éireann (2020–present)
In February 2020, Byrne was re-elected to Dáil Éireann as a TD for Meath East, receiving 6,039 first preference votes. Following the election, as no single party received a governing parliamentary majority, Fianna Fáil leader Micheál Martin assembled a six-person negotiating team, of which Byrne was a member, tasked with reaching out to like-minded political parties with the intent to form a government. After five months of discussion, held during the COVID-19 pandemic, Fianna Fáil, Fine Gael and the Green Party reached an unprecedented agreement to coalesce and establish a governing majority. Following the election of the Government of the 33rd Dáil, Byrne was appointed Minister of State for European Affairs by Taoiseach Micheál Martin.

In May 2020, speaking as opposition spokesperson for Education and Skills, prior to his appointment as Minister of State for European Affairs, Byrne called on the Government, and Minister for Education Joe McHugh TD, to cancel the 2020 Leaving Certificate and implement "fair alternatives" to alleviate undue student stress and anxiety following months of national uncertainty caused by the COVID-19 pandemic. The call received widespread support and led to the adoption of a predicted grading system in place of the traditional Leaving Certificate for 2020.

In December 2022, he was appointed as Minister of State at the Department of Tourism, Culture, Arts, Gaeltacht, Sport and Media with special responsibility for Sport and Physical Education following the appointment of Leo Varadkar as Taoiseach.

Personal life
Byrne married his wife, Ann (née Hunt) Byrne, clinical nurse manager and former Meath ladies' footballer, in the Basilica San Silvestro, Rome, in September 2005.  They live in Meath and have three children.

References

External links
Thomas Byrne TD's profile on the Fianna Fáil website

 

1977 births
Living people
Alumni of Trinity College Dublin
Fianna Fáil TDs
Irish solicitors
Members of the 24th Seanad
Members of the 30th Dáil
Members of the 32nd Dáil
Members of the 33rd Dáil
Politicians from County Meath
Fianna Fáil senators
Ministers of State of the 33rd Dáil